Sniffy may refer to:

Film and TV characters
Sniffy, character in Duke of the Navy
Sniffy, We Were Always Young character played by Joe Laurie, Jr.
Sniffy, character in Convict's Code

Others
 a rat that was saved from becoming art by Rick Gibson
Sniffy, a comic strip by George Fett

See also
Sniffy's, a brand name of scratch and sniff stickers
Sniffy's son ratones o también como me dice mafe de cariño